Bilibin, or Bilibina (feminine; Били́бина), is a common Russian surname. 

It may refer to:

 Ivan Bilibin (1876-1942), Russian illustrator and stage designer 
 Viktor Bilibin (1859-1908), Russian humourist writer and playwright
 Yuri Alexandrovich Bilibin (1901—1952), Russian geologist

Russian-language surnames